This is a list of army brigades of the British Commonwealth and Empire during the Second World War.

These brigades were often part of larger military formations composed of units from the United Kingdom, Dominions, British India and Crown Colonies. At the time, despite their multi-national composition, such formations were often referred as "British".

The territories and peoples comprising many countries mentioned below have changed since the war; in some cases the names of countries have changed or do not correspond to modern country names.

In the list below:
 "formed from" indicates that a brigade was created in part from another unit and;
 "formerly" indicates a simple unit/name change.

Australia
1st Anti-Aircraft Brigade
1st Armoured Brigade
2nd Armoured Brigade
3rd Army Tank Brigade
4th Armoured Brigade
6th Armoured Brigade
1st Cavalry Brigade
2nd Cavalry Brigade
3rd Cavalry Brigade
4th Cavalry Brigade
6th Cavalry Brigade
1st Field Brigade artillery
2nd Field Brigade artillery
3rd Field Brigade artillery
4th Field Brigade artillery
5th Field Brigade artillery
6th Field Brigade artillery
7th Field Brigade artillery
8th Field Brigade artillery
9th Field Brigade artillery
10th Field Brigade artillery
11th Field Brigade artillery
12th Field Brigade artillery
13th Field Brigade artillery
14th Field Brigade artillery
15th Field Brigade artillery
18th Field Brigade artillery
21st Field Brigade artillery
22nd Field Brigade artillery
1st Medium Brigade artillery
2nd Medium Brigade artillery
1st Heavy Brigade	 artillery
2nd Heavy Brigade artillery
3rd Heavy Brigade artillery
5th Heavy Brigade artillery
6th Heavy Brigade artillery
7th Heavy Brigade artillery
1st Garrison Brigade
2nd Garrison Brigade
3rd Garrison Brigade
5th Garrison Brigade
1st Infantry Brigade
2nd Infantry Brigade
3rd Infantry Brigade
4th Infantry Brigade
5th Infantry Brigade
6th Infantry Brigade
7th Infantry Brigade
8th Infantry Brigade
9th Infantry Brigade
10th Infantry Brigade
11th Infantry Brigade
12th Infantry Brigade
13th Infantry Brigade
14th Infantry Brigade
15th Infantry Brigade
16th Infantry Brigade
17th Infantry Brigade
18th Infantry Brigade
19th Infantry Brigade
20th Infantry Brigade
21st Infantry Brigade
22nd Infantry Brigade
23rd Infantry Brigade
24th Infantry Brigade
25th Infantry Brigade
26th Infantry Brigade
27th Infantry Brigade
28th Infantry Brigade
29th Infantry Brigade
30th Infantry Brigade
31st Infantry Brigade
32nd Infantry Brigade
33rd Infantry Brigade
34th Infantry Brigade
1st Motor Brigade
2nd Motor Brigade
3rd Motor Brigade
4th Motor Brigade
5th Motor Brigade
6th Motor Brigade
1st Support Group
1st Training Brigade
2nd Division Infantry Training Brigade
4th Training Brigade
6th Training Brigade
7th Training Brigade
9th Training Brigade

Canada
 1st Canadian Army Group Royal Artillery
 2nd Canadian Army Group Royal Artillery
 1st (Halifax) Coast Brigade, RCA
 3rd (New Brunswick) Coast Brigade RCA
 5th (British Columbia) Coast Brigade RCA
 15th (Vancouver) Coast Brigade RCA
 16th Coast Brigade RCA
 1st Field Brigade, RCA
 2nd Field Brigade, RCA
 3rd Field Brigade, RCA
 5th Field Brigade, RCA
 8th Field Brigade, RCA
 10th Field Brigade, RCA
 11th Field Brigade, RCA
 12th Field Brigade, RCA 
 14th Field Brigade, RCA
 18th Field Brigade, RCA
 19th Field Brigade, RCA
 20th Field Brigade, RCA
 21st Field Brigade, RCA
 24thField Brigade, RCA
 26th Field Brigade, RCA
 27th Field Brigade, RCA
 2nd Medium Brigade, RCA
 4th Medium Brigade, RCA
 6th Medium Brigade, RCA
 7th Medium Brigade, RCA
 1st Canadian Anti-Aircraft Brigade
 1st Canadian Armoured Brigade
 2nd Canadian Armoured Brigade
3rd Canadian Armoured Brigade
 4th Canadian Armoured Brigade
 5th Canadian Armoured Brigade
 1st Canadian Army Tank Brigade
2nd Canadian Army Tank Brigade
 3rd Canadian Army Tank Brigade
1st (Reserve) Cavalry Brigade
2nd (Reserve) Cavalry Brigade
3rd (Reserve) Cavalry Brigade
 1st Canadian Infantry Brigade
 2nd Canadian Infantry Brigade
 3rd Canadian Infantry Brigade
 4th Canadian Infantry Brigade
 5th Canadian Infantry Brigade
 6th Canadian Infantry Brigade
 7th Canadian Infantry Brigade
 8th Canadian Infantry Brigade
 9th Canadian Infantry Brigade
 10th Canadian Infantry Brigade
 11th Canadian Infantry Brigade
 12th Canadian Infantry Brigade
 13th Canadian Infantry Brigade
 14th Canadian Infantry Brigade
 15th Canadian Infantry Brigade
 16th Canadian Infantry Brigade
 17th Canadian Infantry Brigade
 18th Canadian Infantry Brigade
 19th Canadian Infantry Brigade
 20th Canadian Infantry Brigade
 21st Canadian Infantry Brigade
 31st Canadian Infantry Brigade (Reserve)
 32nd Canadian Infantry Brigade (Reserve)
 33rd Canadian Infantry Brigade (Reserve)
 34th Canadian Infantry Brigade (Reserve)
 35th Canadian Infantry Brigade (Reserve)
 36th Canadian Infantry Brigade (Reserve)
 37th Canadian Infantry Brigade (Reserve)
 38th Canadian Infantry Brigade (Reserve)
 39th Canadian Infantry Brigade (Reserve)
 40th Canadian Infantry Brigade (Reserve)
 41st Canadian Infantry Brigade (Reserve)
 42nd Canadian Infantry Brigade (Reserve)
 1st Canadian Infantry Regiment
 2nd Canadian Infantry Regiment
 3rd Canadian Infantry Regiment
 1st Canadian Infantry Training Brigade
 14th Canadian Infantry Training Brigade
 West Brigade 
 Island Brigade 
RCA = Royal Canadian Artillery

New Zealand
 1st New Zealand Infantry Brigade
 2nd New Zealand Infantry Brigade
 3rd New Zealand Infantry Brigade
 4th New Zealand Infantry Brigade
 5th New Zealand Infantry Brigade
 6th New Zealand Infantry Brigade
 7th New Zealand Infantry Brigade
 8th New Zealand Infantry Brigade
 9th New Zealand Infantry Brigade
 10th New Zealand Infantry Brigade
 11th New Zealand Infantry Brigade
 12th New Zealand Infantry Brigade
 14th New Zealand Infantry Brigade
 1st New Zealand Army Tank Brigade
 4th New Zealand Armoured Brigade

South Africa
 1st South African Field Brigade, SAA
 2nd South African Field Brigade, SAA
 3rd South African Field Brigade, SAA
 4th South African Field Brigade, SAA
 5th South African Field Brigade, SAA
 6th South African Field Brigade, SAA
 7th South African Field Brigade, SAA
 The Coast Artillery Brigade, SAA
 1st Anti-Tank Brigade
 2nd Anti-Tank Brigade
 1st South African Infantry Brigade
 2nd South African Infantry Brigade
 3rd South African Infantry Brigade
 4th South African Infantry Brigade
 5th South African Infantry Brigade
 6th South African Infantry Brigade
 7th South African Infantry Brigade
 8th South African Infantry Brigade 
 9th South African Infantry Brigade
 10th South African Infantry Brigade
 11th South African Infantry Brigade
 12th South African Infantry Brigade
 11th South African Armoured Brigade
 12th South African Motorised Infantry Brigade
 13th South African Motorised Infantry Brigade
 1st South African Mounted Brigade
 2nd South African Mounted Brigade
 1st South African Army Tank Brigade
 1st South African Reserve Brigade
SAA = South African Artillery

Straits Settlement
 Straits Settlements Volunteer Force Brigade

See also
 List of British Commonwealth and Empire divisions in the Second World War
 Military history of the British Commonwealth in the Second World War

Notes

References
History of the Second World War (104 volumes), Her Majesty's Stationery Office, London 1949 to 1993
Official History of Australia in the War of 1939–1945 (22 volumes), Australian Government Printing Service, 1952 to 1977
 Official History of the Canadian Army in the Second World War, Vol I Six Years of War, Stacey, C P., Queen's Printer, Ottawa, 1955
 The Canadian Army 1939 – 1945, An Official Historical Summary, Stacey, C P., Queen's Printer, Ottawa, 1948
Official History of the Indian Armed Forces in the Second World War 1939-45 (24 volumes), Combined Inter-Services Historical Section, India & Pakistan, New Delhi, 1956-1966
Official History of New Zealand in the Second World War 1939–45, Historical Publications Branch, Wellington, New Zealand, 1965
 Official Lineages DND, Ottawa

Lists of military units and formations of World War II
 
Brigades of the British Army in World War II
British Empire-related lists